Close-Up Series is a 2014 CD box set from Suzanne Vega. It collects the four Close-Up acoustic albums that Vega produced from 2010–2012 as well as bonus tracks and a DVD of a live performance with backstage footage.

Track listing

Close-Up Vol. 1, Love Songs

Close-Up Vol. 2, People & Places

Close-Up Vol. 3, States of Being

Close-Up Vol. 4, Songs of Family

Vol. 1-4, Bonus Material
All tracks on the fifth disc were previously available as online bonus tracks from various retailers

Live & Backstage at City Winery
The final disc is a DVD featuring live concert footage at the City Winery in New York City interspersed with interview footage.
Introduction from Suzanne
"Tom's Diner"
Interview
"Rock in this Pocket"
Interview
"Gypsy"
Interview
"Solitude Standing"
Interview
"Room off the Street"
Interview
"Silver Lady"
Interview
"Daddy Is White"
Interview
"Penitent"
Interview
"Luka"

References

External links 
 "Suzanne Vega Close-Up Book" (promotional video clip taken off the DVD from Close-Up Book)

2014 compilation albums
Suzanne Vega albums